In theoretical physics, an anti-de Sitter (AdS) black hole is a black hole solution of general relativity or its extensions which represents an isolated massive object, but with a negative cosmological constant.  Such a solution asymptotically approaches anti-de Sitter space at spatial infinity, and is a generalization of the Kerr vacuum solution, which asymptotically approaches Minkowski spacetime at spatial infinity.

In 3+1 dimensions, the metric is given by

where t is the time coordinate, r is the radial coordinate, Ω are the polar coordinates, C is a constant and k is the AdS curvature.

In general, in d+1 dimensions, the metric is given by

According to the AdS/CFT correspondence, if gravity were quantized, an AdS black hole would be dual to a thermal state on the conformal boundary. In the context of say, AdS/QCD, this would correspond to the deconfinement phase of the quark–gluon plasma.

See also
 BTZ black hole
 Black brane

Black holes
Exact solutions in general relativity